The City of Prague Philharmonic Orchestra (Czech: Filharmonici města Prahy) is a classical orchestra, predominantly composed of Czech classical, jazz and guest musicians.

The history of the orchestra goes back to the Film Symphony Orchestra (FISYO), which was founded shortly after World War II, in 1947 as the in-house orchestra for the huge Barrandov Film Studios. After separating and fully privatized it initially performed under the name Czech Symphony Orchestra, but had problems with unauthorized use of the name by other Czech ensembles for themselves. Finally in 1992, after the Velvet Revolution, music producer James Fitzpatrick came up with its current name.

The orchestra is drawn from musicians of the State Opera and the Czech National Theatre, and most of its concerts take place at the opera house.

Recording 
The orchestra play and record music for every type of orchestral project including CD albums, major international films, television series, video games and even ringtones — both for the Czech Republic market but chiefly for clients and media productions all around the world. The orchestra plays more than 250 recording sessions every year and that makes it one of the most recorded and respected orchestras in the world. Also the orchestra recorded many international movie scores. Recordings have been made for film production companies such as Paramount, Sony, Lucasfilm and many others at Smecky Music Studios. David Lynch returned again in 1997 to record his Lost Highway, and yet again in 2001 to record Mulholland Drive. Credit list consists of acclaimed composer names like Alexandre Desplat, Rachel Portman, Mychael Danna, Jeff Danna, Ludovic Bource, Gabriel Yared, Steven Lebetkin, Steve Barakatt and many more. They also created Leading Britain's Conversation's primary jingle.

Hybrid (British band) worked with the orchestra on their studio albums Disappear Here (Hybrid album) and Light of the fearless, as did the band Enter Shikari for the song Elegy For Extinction on their record Nothing is True & Everything is Possible released in 2020.

Concerts 
In recent years the orchestra has performed many concerts of classical and film music repertoire throughout Europe but especially Germany, where it is the “in house” orchestra for Klassik Radio. Now, with the international acclaim for their prize winning recordings, the orchestra is receiving requests for more and more live concerts around the world. These requests peaked with the orchestra performing in front of an audience of 20,000 in Santiago, Chile with conductor Nic Raine and guest soloist Itzhak Perlman.

External links 
 
Official studio website

References 

The City of Prague Philharmonic Orchestra on allmusic.com

Czech orchestras
Musical groups established in 1947
1947 establishments in Czechoslovakia